The participation of the Altai Republic in the Turkvision Song Contest first began at the inaugural Turkvision Song Contest, in Eskişehir, Turkey, in 2013. , a network owned by All-Russia State Television and Radio Broadcasting Company (VGTRK), have been responsible for the selection process of their participants, since their debut in 2013. Artur Marlujokov was the first representative for the Altai Republic at the Turkvision Song Contest 2013 with the song "Altayym Menin", which qualified from the semifinals, and finished in fifth place, achieving one-hundred and eighty-nine points in the grand final.

However, they were forced to withdraw from the contest on 30 November 2015, due to the Russia–Turkey relations in the aftermath of the 2015 Russian Sukhoi Su-24 shootdown near the Syria–Turkey border on 24 November 2015. Although they had selected Emil Tolkochekov to be their participant despite the forced withdrawal. The Altai Republic had confirmed their intent to participate at the Turkvision Song Contest 2016, which was subsequently cancelled due to the December 2016 Istanbul bombings.

Origins of the contest

Turkvision is an annual song contest which was created by TÜRKSOY in cooperation with the Turkish music channel TMB TV. Based on the similar format of the Eurovision Song Contest, Turkvision focuses primarily on participating Turkic countries and regions. The participating countries and regions have to take part in the Semi Final. A juror from each nation awards between 1 and 10 points for every entry, except their own. An amount of 12 to 15 nations qualify for the Grand Final where the jury determines the winner. TÜRKSOY has stated that televoting is going to be introduced in the future. Unlike the Eurovision Song Contest in which the winning country proceeds to host the following year's event, hosting of the Turkvision Song Contest takes place in the country or region that is also hosting the Turkish Capital of Culture.

History

Turkvision Song Contest 2013
The Altai Republic made their debut in the Turkvision Song Contest 2013 in Eskişehir, Turkey. They held a national selection which took place on 21 November 2013, a total of twenty-six singers competed in the selection. On the jury were; Ismet Zaatov – TMB TV Representative, Tatyana Koncheva – Altai State Television General Manager, Oleg Kultuev – Gorniy Altai Media Advertising Agency General Director, Çultuev Alena – Altai State Artist and Moldorov Andrey – Composer. Artur Marljukov was selected by the jury to represent the Altai Republic. On 5 December 2013 the song that Marljukov would sing at the contest was announced as "Altayym Menin". Marlujokov qualified for the final of Turkvizyon 2013, the Altai Republic finished in fifth place achieving a score of one-hundred and eighty-nine points.

2014 withdrawal
On 20 July 2014 it was announced that the Altai Republic were to make their second appearance at the Turkvision Song Contest 2014 to be held in Kazan, Tatarstan in November 2014. However, an updated participation list was published on 10 September 2014, which no longer shown the Altai Republic as participating, although it is unknown as to why they do not show on the list.

2015 return
On 17 November 2015 it was announced that the Altai Republic would return to the contest having not participated in 2014. The singer Emil Tolkochekov was internally selected to represent the region on their return. On 28 November 2015 the Altai Republic withdrew from the contest, this occurred after the Russian Government ordered TURKSOY members from Russia to not compete in the event.

Turkvision Song Contest 2016
However, it was later confirmed that the 2016 contest had been cancelled due to the December 2016 Istanbul bombings. The contest was rescheduled to take place at the Saryarka Velodrome, in Astana, Kazakhstan, though this never materialised.

Participation overview

See also 
 Altai Republic in the Bala Turkvision Song Contest – A singing competition for children, representing countries and regions which are of Turkic-speaking or Turkic ethnicity.
 Russia in the Turkvision Song Contest – List of the Federal subjects of Russia which have participated in the Turkvision Song Contest as individual regions.

References 

Culture of the Altai Republic
Altai Republic
Altai Republic
Altai music